The Namibia women's national football team is the national women's football team of Namibia and is overseen by the Namibia Football Association.

Results and fixtures

The following is a list of match results in the last 12 months, as well as any future matches that have been scheduled.

Legend

2022

Coaching staff

Current coaching staff
last update 30/08/2022

Manager history
Uerikondjera Kasaona (????–2022)
Paulus Shipanga(2022-)

Players

Current squad
 The following final squad  were named in october 2022  forfriendly game against .
 Caps and goals accurate up to and including 6 April 2021.

Recent call-ups
The following players have been called up to a Namibia  squad in the past 12 months.

Previous squads
COSAFA Women's Championship
 2022 COSAFA Women's Championship squad

Records
 Active players in bold, statistics correct as of 2020.

Most capped players

Top goalscorers

Honours

Regional
COSAFA Women's Championship
 Runners-up: 2006

Competitive record

FIFA Women's World Cup

Olympic Games

Africa Women Cup of Nations

African Games

COSAFA Women's Championship

*Draws include knockout matches decided on penalty kicks.

Honours

All−time record against FIFA recognized nations
The list shown below shows the Djibouti national football team all−time international record against opposing nations.
*As of xxxxxx after match against  xxxx.
Key

Record per opponent
*As ofxxxxx after match against  xxxxx.
Key

The following table shows Djibouti's all-time official international record per opponent:

See also

Sport in Namibia
Football in Namibia
Women's football in Namibia
Namibia women's national under-20 football team
Namibia women's national under-17 football team
Namibia men's national football team

References

External links
Namibia women's national football team – official website at NFA 
FIFA profile

 
African women's national association football teams